The Ultimatum (simplified Chinese: 双子星) was a Singaporean television drama series that was produced by MediaCorp Studios in 2009 and aired on MediaCorp Channel 8. Starring Zoe Tay, Fann Wong, Li Nanxing and Tay Ping Hui, the series was the first drama to be fully filmed in HD. As of 7 July 2009, all 30 episodes of The Ultimatum have been aired on Channel 8.

Episodic Guide

See also
The Ultimatum
List of programmes broadcast by Mediacorp Channel 8

References

Lists of Singaporean television series episodes